Nephelium cuspidatum, also known as rambutan hutan in Malay and buah sibau in Iban, is a species of flowering plant, a tropical forest fruit-tree in the rambutan family, that is native to Southeast Asia.

Varieties
Varieties include:
 N. cuspidatum var. cuspidatum Blume
 N. cuspidatum var. robustum (Radlk.) Leenh.
 N. cuspidatum var. eriopetalum (Miq.) Leenh.
 N. cuspidatum var. multinerve Leenh.
 N. cuspidatum var. bassacense Leenh.
 N. cuspidatum var. ophiodes Leenh.

Description
The species grows as a tree to 40 m in height with a 3–6 m bole and small buttresses. The pinnate leaves have 2–13 pairs of oval to oblong leaflets. The inflorescences consist of spikes or racemes of pink and white flowers. The hairy, oval, red to yellowish-red fruits are 2–4 cm long by 2–3 cm in diameter, each containing a seed covered with an edible, white sarcotesta.

Distribution and habitat
The species occurs over a wide range extending from Myanmar to Thailand, Cambodia, Vietnam, the Philippines, the Malay Peninsula, Borneo, Sumatra and Java. It occurs in mixed dipterocarp forest, usually on ridges and hillslopes.

Usage
The species is widely cultivated and the fruits sold in markets.

References

 
cuspidatum
Flora of Malesia
Fruits originating in Asia
Plants described in 1849
Taxa named by Carl Ludwig Blume